The 2016 CIS Women's Final 8 Basketball Tournament was held March 17–20, 2016, in Fredericton, New Brunswick. It was hosted by University of New Brunswick at the Richard J. Currie Centre.

This proved to be the last Women's Final 8 branded as a CIS championship. On October 20, 2016, Canadian Interuniversity Sport, the country's governing body for university athletics and the organizer of the Final 8, changed its name to U Sports.

Participating teams

Championship Bracket

Consolation Bracket

See also 
2016 CIS Men's Basketball Championship

References 

U Sports Women's Basketball Championship
2015–16 in Canadian basketball
2016 in women's basketball